The People v. O. J. Simpson: American Crime Story is the first season of the FX true crime anthology television series American Crime Story. The season, which debuted on February 2, 2012, revolves around the O. J. Simpson murder case and is based on Jeffrey Toobin's book The Run of His Life: The People v. O. J. Simpson (1997).

The season received critical acclaim, with praise for most of the performances (particularly Paulson, Vance, Brown and Travolta), directing and writing. For the 68th Primetime Emmy Awards, the season received 22 Primetime Emmy Award nominations, in 13 categories, winning nine, including Outstanding Limited Series, the highest after Game of Thrones that year, which won 12 awards. It also won the Golden Globe Awards for Best Miniseries or Television Film and Best Actress – Miniseries or Television Film for Sarah Paulson.

Cast

Main

 Sterling K. Brown as Christopher Darden
 Kenneth Choi as Judge Lance Ito
 Christian Clemenson as William Hodgman
 Cuba Gooding Jr. as O. J. Simpson
 Bruce Greenwood as Gil Garcetti
 Nathan Lane as F. Lee Bailey
 Sarah Paulson as Marcia Clark
 David Schwimmer as Robert Kardashian
 John Travolta as Robert Shapiro
 Courtney B. Vance as Johnnie Cochran

Recurring

Guest

Archive footage/audio

Episodes

Production

Development
On October 7, 2014, it was announced that FX had ordered a 10-episode season of American Crime Story, developed by Scott Alexander and Larry Karaszewski, and executive produced by Alexander and Karaszewski, as well as Ryan Murphy and Brad Falchuk. Murphy also directed the pilot episode. Other executive producers are Nina Jacobson and Brad Simpson. Co-executive producers are Anthony Hemingway and D. V. DeVincentis. All 10 episodes were expected to be written by Alexander and Karaszewski. The series was previously in development at Fox but since moved to the company's sibling cable network FX. Murphy and others wanted to create an unbiased account of the trial by doing “certain takes guilty, certain takes innocent” according to Cuba Gooding Jr so that they would have a “plethora of emotions to play with”.

Casting
Cuba Gooding Jr. and Sarah Paulson were the first to be cast as Simpson and Marcia Clark, respectively. Subsequently, David Schwimmer was cast as Robert Kardashian. In January 2015, it was reported that John Travolta had joined the cast as Robert Shapiro; he would also serve as producer. In February 2015, Courtney B. Vance joined the series as Johnnie Cochran. In March 2015, it was announced that Connie Britton would co-star as Faye Resnick. April 2015 saw the casting of Sterling K. Brown as Christopher Darden, Jordana Brewster as Denise Brown, and Kenneth Choi as Judge Lance Ito. In May 2015, it was confirmed Selma Blair would be portraying Kris Kardashian Jenner. In July 2015, it was announced Nathan Lane had joined the cast as F. Lee Bailey.

Filming
Principal photography began on May 14, 2015, in Los Angeles, California.

Promotion
In October 2015, FX released its first promotional trailer for The People v. O. J. Simpson, showing an Akita dog whining, walking from its residence onto a sidewalk to bark, then walking back to its residence, leaving behind bloody paw prints. Later that month another teaser was released, wherein the first actual footage of Travolta as Shapiro was shown. In the teaser, Shapiro is about to ask Simpson (whose face is unseen) if he is responsible for the murder of Simpson's ex-wife. In the next short teaser that was released, Simpson (again unseen) is taking a lie detector test.

In November, two new teasers were released. The first shows Simpson writing his attempted suicide letter, while a voice-over by Gooding, Jr. narrates. The second shows the police chasing Simpson's white Ford Bronco, while dozens of fans cheer for him.

The first full trailer was released in December, along with a poster for the season. The trailer included Simpson sitting in the childhood bedroom of Kim Kardashian and contemplating suicide while Robert Kardashian tries to stop him.

Reception

Reviews
The People v. O.J. Simpson received acclaim from critics. The review aggregator Rotten Tomatoes gave the season an approval rating of 97%, based on 89 reviews, with an average rating of 8.74/10. The site's critical consensus read, "The People v. O. J. Simpson: American Crime Story brings top-shelf writing, directing, and acting to bear on a still-topical story while shedding further light on the facts—and provoking passionate responses along the way." On Metacritic, the season has a score of 90 out of 100, based on 45 critics, indicating "universal acclaim".

Many critics singled out many cast members for the performances, particularly Paulson and Vance. Dan Feinberg of The Hollywood Reporter praised the performances of Paulson and Vance, writing: "As Clark's discomfort grows, Paulson's collection of tics seem more and more human, [...] Vance's Cochran is sometimes hilarious, but he has a dynamic range such that he's occasionally introspective and always intelligent as well." Brian Lowry of Variety praised the casting of the smaller roles, particularly Connie Britton as Faye Resnick and Nathan Lane as F. Lee Bailey.

Travolta and Gooding's respective portrayals of Shapiro and Simpson were met with mixed reviews by critics. Brian Lowry of Variety called Travolta "awful" in the role, adding: "Yes, Shapiro spoke in stiff, measured tones, but the actor's overly mannered line readings turn the attorney into a buffoon, in sharp contrast to the more nuanced portrayals around him." Nicole Jones of Vanity Fair called his performance "campy and calculated". Dan Feinberg of The Hollywood Reporter also criticized his performance, calling it "a mesmerizingly bad performance from the eyebrows down." He also wrote that "His unnecessary accent varies by episode, and Travolta's laser intensity feels arch and almost kabuki at times, turning Shapiro into a terrifying character from the next American Horror Story installment, rather than a part of this ensemble."

Maureen Ryan of Vanity Fair, conversely, became more impressed with Travolta as the season progressed: "I started in the realm of puzzled disbelief, arrived at amusement, and ultimately traveled to a place of sincere appreciation. You simply can't take your eyes off Travolta, and that is a form of enchantment." Elisabeth Garber-Paul of Rolling Stone also called it "arguably [Travolta's] best performance since" Pulp Fiction. Robert Bianco of USA Today wrote that Travolta's was the show's "broadest performance".

Dave Schilling of The Guardian panned Gooding's performance, writing: "his whiny, gravely voice sounds absolutely nothing like the real O. J. Simpson's deep, commanding tones." Michael Starr of New York Post also was highly critical of Gooding's performance, saying that he "portrays Simpson as a hollow, sad-sack cipher who speaks in a high-pitched whine and sleepwalks in a fog he never shakes after being arrested for the brutal double murder of ex-wife Nicole Brown and Ron Goldman. He's a forgettable, annoying presence in what should be a showcase role for Gooding—who, to be fair, is reciting lines written for him, so he can only do so much with the material."

On the other hand, Joe McGovern was more positive on Gooding's performance, writing that his casting "takes a risk and pulls it off." Elisabeth Garber-Paul of Rolling Stone described his performance as "an unnervingly believable take on a potential psychopath with teetering sanity." Nick Venable of Cinema Blend also opined that Gooding's turn as Simpson "could indeed get him on a shortlist of Emmy nominees."

In spite of the mixed reviews for their performances, Gooding and Travolta received Emmy nominations. Travolta was also nominated as one of the producers of the show in the Outstanding Limited Series category, which he ultimately won. Gooding's nomination was criticized by some reviewers.

Reaction from individuals involved
Mark Fuhrman, who is portrayed by Steven Pasquale, refused to watch the series and called his portrayal untruthful. In an interview with New York Post, he said, "The last 20 years, I have watched the facts dismissed by the media, journalists and the public simply because it does not fit within the politically correct narrative. At this late date, FX is attempting to establish a historical artifact with this series without reaching out to any prosecution sources. In a time when Americans read less and less and investigative journalism is on vacation, it is sad that this movie will be the historical word on this infamous trial. After all, it was 'based on a true story.'"

Marcia Clark praised the series and called Sarah Paulson's portrayal of her "phenomenal". During an interview on The Wendy Williams Show, Clark admitted that she watched the series with friends "to keep me from jumping off the balcony", and that she was emotionally unable to watch the series' recreation of Fuhrman's testimony. Clark also said her sons were only able to watch the first episode. Clark went to the Emmys with Sarah Paulson, who won that night for her performance.

The families of Brown and Goldman expressed anger at the show. Nicole Brown's sister, Tanya Brown, lashed out at the cast members for what she saw as a lack of consultation with the families. Ron Goldman's father, Fred Goldman, expressed numerous criticisms of the series even though they were portrayed sympathetically. Among them was his statement that the series did not devote enough material to his son, who is only depicted on the show as a corpse. He expressed concern that the generations of people who were too young to understand the events at the time would assume the series' depiction of events was accurate. Goldman's family also criticized the series for not depicting the murders, as they believe that Goldman died trying to save Brown from her attacker and that he was the man who eyewitnesses heard shouting that night. Goldman's sister, Kim, criticized the series for sympathetic portrayals of Simpson and Kardashian, despite the fact that in real life, Kardashian had admitted to having had actual doubts about Simpson's innocence and eventually severed his ties with him.

Ratings

Accolades

Home media 
The People v. O. J. Simpson: American Crime Story was released on Blu-Ray and DVD on September 6, 2016 by 20th Century Fox Home Entertainment.

References

See also
 O.J.: Made in America-The 2016 Oscar-winning documentary that featured some of the participants portrayed in the miniseries
 June 17th, 1994-An episode of the acclaimed 30 for 30 series from ESPN that also covered the OJ Bronco chase
 American Tragedy-The 2000 TV movie that also covered the Simpson trail
 The O. J. Simpson Story

External links
 
 

Television series set in the 1990s
Television series set in 1994
Television series set in 1995
2016 American television series debuts
2016 American television seasons
01
Television shows about death
Television courtroom dramas
Fictional portrayals of the Los Angeles Police Department
Murder in television
O. J. Simpson murder case
American police procedural television series
Television shows based on non-fiction books
Television shows set in Los Angeles
True crime television series
Biographical films about criminals
Television series about prosecutors
Television shows related to the Kardashian–Jenner family